Harmsdorf may refer to the following places in Schleswig-Holstein, Germany:

 Harmsdorf, Lauenburg
 Harmsdorf, Ostholstein

See also 
 Harmstorf (disambiguation)